Leigh Wood is a British professional boxer who held the WBA featherweight title between 2021 and 2023. At regional level he held the Commonwealth featherweight title in 2019 and the British featherweight title in 2021. As of October 2021, Wood is ranked as the world's fourth-best active featherweight by BoxRec, sixth by The Ring magazine, and seventh by the Transnational Boxing Rankings Board.

Professional career

Early career
Wood fought Gavin McDonnell for the British super bantamweight title on 22 February 2014 but loss after the fight was stopped in the 6th round due to Wood being stunned and unable to defend himself. Wood put on an impressive performance and was in control of the fight after winning the first 5 rounds, but prior to the fight Wood had to lose weight for himself to make the weight limit for the fight and after a few rounds Wood was becoming tired. After the loss to McDonnell, Wood had a comeback fight against Martin Mubiru and put in good performance and earned a 3rd-round TKO.

Then after 3 more fights and 3 more wins at featherweight, he stepped up in class to box the man who took his former foe to a draw Josh Wale in a British title eliminator. Wood outboxed Josh Wale for the majority of the fight finishing with last 2 of the 10 rounds with eye catching combinations and powerful right hands, winning the fight unanimously on all 3 scorecards.

Wood's next fight was a redemption fight for the Midlands Area featherweight title against Lee Glover who beat Wood in the Amateurs 7 years prior. Wood came out in the first round pot shooting and making Glover miss before landing some big punches before the bell. The second round went the same way, finally Wood stopping Glover with a big left and perfectly picked flurry of punches, sending Glover to the canvas and not making the count.

Wood faced Abraham Osei Bonsu for the vacant Commonwealth featherweight title on 2 March 2019. He made quick work of Bonsu, winning the fight by a second-round knockout. Wood made his first title defence against the former Commonwealth featherweight champion Ryan Doyle on 10 May 2019. Wood won the fight by a tenth-round knockout. He first staggered Doyle with a left hook and a flurry of punches, before knocking him out with a counter left hook.

Wood challenged the reigning WBO European featherweight champion David Oliver Joyce in The Golden Contract Featherweight Tournament Quarter-final, which was held on 4 October 2019. He won the fight by a ninth-round technical knockout. Wood made his first WBO European title defence against Jazza Dickens in The Golden Contract featherweight tournament semifinals on 21 February 2020. He lost the bout by a narrow majority decision. Two of the judges scored the fight 95–94 and 96–94 for Dickens, while the third judge scored the fight as an even 95–95 draw.

WBA (Regular) featherweight champion

Wood vs. Xu
On 6 July 2021, it was announced that Wood would challenge WBA (Regular) featherweight champion Xu Can in Brentwood, Essex on 31 July as part of Matchroom's Fight Camp. Despite being an 11/4 underdog, Wood outboxed the champion during periods of the fight, and prevailed with an upset victory via twelfth-round technical knockout. Xu was down on the scorecards at the time of the stoppage, with scores of 105–102, 104–103 and 104–103. Wood landed 222 of his 935 total punches (24%) and 190 of his 477 power punches (40%), compared to Xu's 208 total and 136 power punches.

Wood vs. Conlan
His first defence of his new title came against Michael Conlan on 12 March 2022 at the Motorpoint Arena in Nottingham. Wood was knocked down in the final seconds of the first round, Conlan continued to dominate the fight for the next few rounds, but in the later rounds Wood came back into the fight, with Conlan going down in the 11th round, it was scored as a knockdown despite protests from Conlan's corner that it was a slip. In the 12th round, with Conlan being ahead on all the scorecards, Wood managed to knock out Conlan 1:25 into the round, with Conlan falling through the ropes and being taken to hospital for checks. Conlan said since that he is "all good" and that the scans were "clear". Wood's twelfth-round technical knockout of Conlan was awarded as the winner of both The Ring magazine Fight of the Year 2022 and The Ring magazine Knockout of the Year 2022.

WBA featherweight champion

Wood vs. Lara
On 6 April 2022, WBA formally ordered their "Super" champion Leo Santa Cruz to face Wood in a mandatory title defence. They gave the pair 30 days to come to terms and avoid a purse bid. Matchroom Boxing argued for a 50-50 purse split in lieu of the traditional split between a "Super" champion and mandatory title challenger, which would've seen Santa Cruz receive the lion's share of the purse. As such, Santa Cruz's TGB Promotions and Wood's Matchroom Boxing were unable to reach a deal.

On 19 July 2022, the WBA once again ordered their featherweight "Super" champion Leo Santa Cruz to face Wood and gave the champion 24 hours to respond to the order. Santa Cruz requested an exemption from his mandatory defence to face the WBC featherweight champion Rey Vargas instead, which was denied by the sanctioning body. Santa Cruz then offered Wood step-aside money to postpone their fight so he could face Vargas, which was refused by Wood's camp. On 1 August, the WBA notified both camps that a purse bid would be held on 12 August, with a minimum allowed bid of $150,000, with a 75% share going to Santa Cruz as the "Super" titlist. Matchroom Boxing previously submitted an appeal for an even purse split, which was refused by the WBA. They successfully avoided a purse bid, as the two sides reached an agreement to finalise the fight on 12 August. The agreement wasn't to face each other however, but to pursue separate fights. This request was approved by the WBA on 24 August 2022. The same day, it was announced that Wood would make his second WBA (Regular) title defence against Mauricio Lara. The title bout was expected to headline a DAZN broadcast card, which took place at the Motorpoint Arena Nottingham in Nottingham, England on 24 September 2022. Wood withdrew from the fight ten days before it was supposed to take place, due to a torn biceps suffered in sparring.

On 30 September, the WBA once again ordered Wood and Santa Cruz to enter into negotiations for a title consolidation bout. On 12 December, Santa Cruz vacated his title and Wood was left as the sole champion in the division. As the bout with Santa Cruz fell through, Wood was once again booked to make his second featherweight title defence against Mauricio Lara. The fight took place on 18 February 2023. Wood was knocked down with a left hook near the end of the seventh round. Although he was able to rise from the canvas in time to beat the ten count, his trainer Ben Davison decided to throw in the towel six seconds before the end of the round.

Professional boxing record

See also
List of world featherweight boxing champions
List of British world boxing champions

References

External links

Leigh Wood - Profile, News Archive & Current Rankings at Box.Live

|-

|-

1988 births
Living people
English male boxers
People from Gedling (district)
Sportspeople from Nottinghamshire
Super-bantamweight boxers
Featherweight boxers
World featherweight boxing champions
Commonwealth Boxing Council champions
British Boxing Board of Control champions
World Boxing Association champions